Ardchullarie More is a small hamlet in the Stirling council area, Scotland and is situated on the eastern side of Loch Lubnaig.

External links

Scottish Places - Ardchullarie More
Canmore - Ardchullarie More site record

Hamlets in Stirling (council area)